Rameh Char may refer to:
 Rameh Char, Bushehr
 Rameh Char, Isfahan